Tengku Azlan ibni Almarhum Sultan Abu Bakar Ri’ayatuddin Al-Mu’azzam Shah (born 21 July 1949) is a former Malaysian politician and was the Member of the Parliament of Malaysia (MP) for the Jerantut constituency in Pahang from 1999 to 2013. Starting from 9 August 2021; he is a member of United Malays National Organisation (UMNO) of Barisan Nasional (BN), after his resignation as Termeloh constituency chief from Malaysian United Indigenous Party or Parti Pribumi Bersatu Malaysia (BERSATU), a component of Pakatan Harapan (PH) and later Perikatan Nasional (PN) coalition, which he joined since he quitted UMNO in 2018 for second time.

Tengku Azlan declined a deputy Minister post after the 2008 election, having previously served as a deputy Minister for Transport. He was replaced by Ahmad Nazlan Idris as the Barisan Nasional candidate for Jerantut in the 2013 election. He was a member of the opposition Semangat 46 party early in his political career, running for Parliament unsuccessfully in the 1995 election

Tengku Azlan is the brother of Sultan Ahmad Shah of Pahang. He is married to Tunku Puteri Negeri Sembilan Tunku Puan Sri Dato' Seri Jawahir Binti Almarhum Tuanku Ja’afar and they have two sons and a daughter.

Tengku Azlan was conferred the title "Tengku Panglima Besar" by Al-Sultan Abdullah of Pahang on 30 July 2021.

Election results

Honours

Honours of Malaysia
  : 
  Commander of the Order of Loyalty to the Crown of Malaysia (PSM) - Tan Sri (2011)
  :
  Knight Grand Commander of the Grand Order of Tuanku Ja’afar (SPTJ) - Dato' Seri (1985)
  :
  Knight Companion of the Order of Sultan Ahmad Shah of Pahang (DSAP) - Dato' (1979)
  Grand Knight of the Order of the Crown of Pahang (SIMP) - formerly Dato', now Dato' Indera (2002)
  Grand Knight of the Order of Sultan Ahmad Shah of Pahang (SSAP) - Dato' Sri (2007)

References

Living people
1949 births
People from Pahang
Malaysian people of Malay descent
Malaysian Muslims
Royal House of Pahang
United Malays National Organisation politicians
Parti Melayu Semangat 46 politicians
Members of the Dewan Rakyat
Commanders of the Order of Loyalty to the Crown of Malaysia
Sons of monarchs